The Podilskyi Bridge, also known as Podilsko-Voskresenskyi Bridge, is a combined road-rail bridge over the Dnipro River under construction in Kyiv, Ukraine. It is a focal point of construction of the Podilsko-Vyhurivska Line of the Kyiv Metro.

The two-level and -long bridge is intended to carry part of the future Podilsko-Vyhurivska Line of the Kyiv Metro and three lanes of road traffic in each direction, connecting the central Podil neighborhood to the left-bank parts of the city. The top level of the bridge will carry road traffic, while the bottom will carry rail traffic.

Construction is being carried out by the Kyiv City Council.

Location
The bridge is located midway between the existing road Petrovskyi Railroad Bridge and the Parkovyi Pedestrian Bridge. The first entrance is planned to begin with intersection at Mezhyhirska and Naberezhno-Luhova Street, the second one from the right bank's Verkhnii Val and Naberezhno-Khreshchatytska Street (current location of the closed Rybalskyi Bridge, that is planned to be dismantled). The third entrence is at Rybalskyi Peninsula from Naberezhno-Rybalska Street. At the left bank the bridge will be connected to Suleimana Stalskoho Street that leads to Perova Boulevard.

Design
The bridge is intended to connect Podil on the right bank with Voskresenka and Raiduzhnyi Masyv on the left bank. Starting in Podil the bridge will cross the Rybalskyi Peninsula, the Dnipro River, Trukhaniv Island, and the Rusanivski Sady dacha community, terminating on the left bank.

It consists of several major components:
 three bridges over Kyiv Harbor
 a bridge over Dnipro (main part)
 a bridge over Chortoryi
 a bridge over Raiduzhne Lake
 viaducts over Trukhaniv Island and Horbachykha
 four multi-level road interchanges

The bridge roadway is intended to have three lanes each way with a projected traffic intensity of 59,000 vehicles per day. The bridge will also carry the Podilsko–Vyhurivska line containing three metro stations on the bridge.

History
A bridge from Podil to Voskresenka had been planned since the Soviet era and appeared in the Kyiv master plan for 1985–2005. The first construction project was accepted in 1993 and the construction began in that year with a plan of finishing in 2001, however it was soon suspended due to the difficult financial situation.

 After some years of being abandoned, the bridge reappeared in the Kyiv master plan for 2005–2020. December 28, 2003, marked the renewal of land preparation at Trukhaniv Island, and the new project was accepted in 2004. This year also marked the connection of the bridge with the left bank. At the start of construction, the bridge was planned to be opened in 2007, but inadequate funding meant that the completion date was postponed to 2008. In 2007, the construction was expanded to Rybalskyi Peninsula, connecting it to the right bank. To start the construction, part of the shipbuilding plant had to be demolished. In addition, residents of nearby dormitories had to be resettled; resettling was also planned a number of private houses at Rusanivski Gardens on the left bank. Meanwhile, the planned opening was once again postponed, this time to 2010.

In 2009, the assembly of an arch on the bridge from Rybalskyi to Trukhaniv started, alongside it the piers for a bridge from Podil were built. On the Rybalskyi Peninsula, the construction of the exit to the Naberezhno-Rybalska Road also began. There was a plan to build a skyscraper on it, but later it was scrapped. The planned opening of the bridge was moved back to 2011.

 From 2010 the majority of the work was carried out on the right bank, while on the left bank there was the problem of resettling Rusanivski Gardens. Due to this the completion of construction was delayed yet again, this time to 2014, and then to 2016. In February it was decided to buy and demolish the private houses that were blocking the construction process and resettle the owners to Bykivnya. Despite the resistance of the residents, the destruction began in October. In December 2011, legal issues with the private owners of the land were settled, and the construction process was finally expanded to Trukhaniv Island. In June 2012, the Kyiv River Harbor administration building was demolished due to the plan to build an entrance to the bridge from the Naberezhno-Khreshchatytska Street.

The work on an arch was planned to be finished in October 2012, but lack of funding caused the construction to slow down, so even in 2013, there was almost no progress. At the end of the year Swedish company, Eurocon joined Mostobud in the project to accelerate the construction. In February 2014 despite the ongoing Revolution of Dignity the process of arch's segment lifting had begun, it was finished by the 4th March in a strong fog. 19 June the final segment of the arch was installed. After that, the construction was put on hold since there was not enough money to continue the construction.

Since the Autumn of 2016, it was planned to finish the construction in 2019 with investment from Germany. In December it was decided to change the temporary piers to full-time ones. In April 2017 two contests for finishing the bridge was held, one for a section from Podil to Rusanivski Gardens and one for a part from Rusanivski Gardens to Voskresenka. Both contests were won by EcoBudTrade. By results of technical inspection, held by German experts, the bridge was 50% ready. In August bridge construction was renewed. In 2018, construction accelerated, in July the arch connections began to be assembled, the first one was installed in August. During the inspection in October Mayor of Kyiv Vitali Klitschko stated that the bridge would be opened by the end of 2020.

In November 2018, the dormitory at Rybalskyi Peninsula that was in the way of future bridge was demolished. In January 2019, the construction at Rusanivski Gardens began, where the bridge had to reach the railway. In March, the last arch connection was installed. In April, the preparation for Nyzhnii Val Street entrance construction had begun. On April 29, the old Rybalskyi Bridge was closed for dismantling. In August, dismantling of the temporary piers had begun. In September, the preparation work for the entrance from Naberezhno-Khreshchatytska Street was renewed.

On 1 February 2021, Klitschko stated that the bridge would be opened by the summer of 2021. Also in February 2021, Head of the Kyiv Urban Planning Council Vitali Selyk predicted that it would be possible to build the automobile part of the bridge no earlier than the end of the year, provided that the pace of construction would be comparable to that of the six months before the 2020 Kyiv local election, and if work began immediately. Construction is unlikely to continue in the foreseeable future due the Russian invasion of Ukraine ongoing since February 24, 2022.

Controversies

Residential complex at Kyiv River Port
In July 2019 SAGA Development introduced the Novyi Podil residential complex, to build it they had planned to demolish Kyiv River Port. The main problem was that the project was located right on the way of not yet built main bridge entrance. Despite that fact the project was approved and the construction of the complex had started in 2021 being in conflict with a construction of the bridge.

Eco activism for Radunka Lake
There were two alternative variants of left bank bridge entrance, one was suggesting the straight connection with Perova Boulevard and the other one had roundabout to Romana Shukhevycha Avenue. The activists were stating that the first variant will kill the Radunka Lake over which the bridge should go through to reach the Suleimana Stalskoho Street. Since February 2019 it was planned to make an alternative project of the bridge with a junction right before Radunka which leads to Alishera Navoi Avenue. Currently it is planned to connect the bridge to both Shukhevycha Avenue and Perova Boulevard even though on the way of the bridges are already the Radunka eco-park and a new public garden near the Troieshchyna that makes finishing the bridge impossible without cutting the green areas.

Accidents

On November 18, 2011, a crane vessel Zakhariy that was being used in the construction fell into the river and broke apart. The accident destroyed the crane and polluted the Dnieper's waters with crane oil and construction materials. During the accident, two other barges were damaged; the Harbor Bridge received light damage.

There were several accidents involving people falling off the bridge while exploring the incomplete construction work when construction was abandoned in 2014–2017.

On 14 September 2016, part of the bridge at Rybalskyi Peninsula caught fire due to a short circuit.

In popular culture
In 2017, French rapper Orelsan produced a video-clip on this bridge for his song "Basique".

Some scenes from the Diesel brand "Go with the Flow" campaign were filmed on this bridge.

In 2019, Chinese boy band WayV released a music video for the song "Take Off" among the locations in the video, you can see this Bridge.

The music video for Rosalía's "Saoko", which premiered in 2022, was mainly filmed on this bridge.

Gallery

See also
 Bridges in Kyiv
 Kyiv River Port

References

External links
 

Road bridges in Kyiv
Railroad bridges in Kyiv
Kyiv Metro
Buildings and structures under construction in Ukraine
Bridges on Trukhaniv Island
Bridges under construction